Christian David "Jim" Roper (August 13, 1916 – June 23, 2000) was a NASCAR driver. He lived in Halstead, Kansas. He is most known as the winner of the first ever NASCAR race at Charlotte.

Racing career
Roper lived at his grandfather's horse farm in Halstead. Roper was interested in playing basketball until his grandfather purchased a Chevrolet Pontiac car dealership and gave a 1930 Chevy to Roper. Roper said "I raced that thing seven nights a week, even in the middle of winter, on a figure-eight dirt track, the kind you pass in the middle both ways. I could get that Chevy up to speeds of 60 to 70 miles per hour."

Roper purchased a midget car in 1944. He was first able to use the car after World War II since all racing was halted in the United States during the war. He drove numerous types of cars after the war. He won the Beacon Championship at CeJay Speedway in Wichita, Kansas in 1947 in a track roadster. He also raced on the International Motor Contest Association (IMCA) circuit in Kansas, Iowa, Nebraska, Oklahoma, and Missouri.

He was nicknamed "Alfalfa Jim" after he drove through a wooden fence into an alfalfa field, turned around, and finished the race with a car full of alfalfa.

NASCAR career
Roper heard about the first race at a three-quarter-mile dirt track in Charlotte, NC by reading a note about it in Zack Mosley's The Adventures of Smilin' Jack comic strip in his local newspaper. Roper convinced local car dealer Millard Clothier to drive two of Clothier's Lincoln cars more than 1000 miles to Charlotte to compete on June 19, 1949. Roper finished in second to the winner Glenn Dunaway, completing 197 of 200 laps. Chief NASCAR inspector Al Crisler disqualified Dunnaway's car because car owner Hubert Westmoreland had shored up the chassis by spreading the rear springs, a favorite bootlegger trick to improve traction and handling  . Roper was credited with the win in NASCAR's first Strictly Stock race. Westmoreland sued NASCAR, and the judge threw out the case. NASCAR tore down Roper's motor after the race, so he had to get a replacement motor to drive back to Kansas. Clothier kept the winner's trophy.

He used the same car to finish fifteenth in NASCAR's third race in his only other NASCAR start. He finished sixteenth in the 1949 final points standings.

Injury and end of racing career
Roper continued racing in midgets in Kansas until he broke a vertebra in a sprint car accident in Davenport, Iowa in 1955. He decided to retire after his injuries healed. "It was over for me then," he said, "so I flipped a half-dollar (coin) to decide whether to raise horses in Texas or Washington. Texas won." He later became a professional flagman and built race cars. On April 18, 1993, at age 76, he was the grand marshal of the First Union 400 in North Wilkesboro, North Carolina.

On June 23, 2000, he died in Newton, Kansas from heart and liver complications related to cancer.

Motorsports career results

NASCAR
(key) (Bold – Pole position awarded by qualifying time. Italics – Pole position earned by points standings or practice time. * – Most laps led.)

Strictly Stock Series

References

External links

Story of NASCAR's first race 
Obituary

1916 births
2000 deaths
People from Harvey County, Kansas
Racing drivers from Kansas
NASCAR drivers
Deaths from cancer in Kansas